Principal series may refer to:
 Principal series (spectroscopy), series of spectral lines
 Principal series representation , topological group theory,

Science disambiguation pages